Michael Hutchinson may refer to:

Michael Hutchinson (cyclist) (born 1973), British racing cyclist and writer 
Michael Hutchinson (ice hockey) (born 1990), Canadian ice hockey goaltender
Michael Hutchinson (politician), Belizean politician

See also
 Michael Hutchinson Jenks (1795–1867), member of the U.S. House of Representatives from Pennsylvania